El Jebel is an unincorporated community and a census-designated place (CDP) located in and governed by Eagle County, Colorado, United States. The CDP is a part of the Edwards, CO Micropolitan Statistical Area. The population of the El Jebel CDP was 3,801 at the United States Census 2010. The Carbondale Post Office (ZIP Code 81623) serves El Jebel postal addresses.

History
El Jebel grew rapidly in the last two decades of the 20th century with the population increase in the valley downstream from Aspen.

Etymology
"El Jebel" means "the mountain" in Arabic.

Geography

El Jebel is located in the Roaring Fork Valley, between Carbondale and Basalt, along the north side of State Highway 82. 

Climate
This climate type is dominated by the winter season, a long, bitterly cold period with short, clear days, relatively little precipitation mostly in the form of snow, and low humidity.  According to the Köppen Climate Classification system, El Jebel has a subarctic climate, abbreviated "Dfc" on climate maps.

Demographics

See also

Outline of Colorado
Index of Colorado-related articles
State of Colorado
Colorado cities and towns
Colorado census designated places
Colorado counties
Eagle County, Colorado
List of statistical areas in Colorado
Edwards, CO Micropolitan Statistical Area

References

External links

El Jebel @ ElJebel.co
El Jebel @ Colorado.com
El Jebel @ UncoverColorado.com
Eagle County website

Census-designated places in Eagle County, Colorado
Census-designated places in Colorado
Roaring Fork Valley